XEFE may refer to:

 XEFE-TV, a television station serving the Laredo-Nuevo Laredo Metropolitan Area
 XEFE-AM, a radio station serving the Laredo-Nuevo Laredo Metropolitan Area